Glidden Mercantile, at 102 N. Main in Bridger, Montana, was built in 1905.  It was listed on the National Register of Historic Places in 1987.

It is a two-story  furniture factory building.  It was designed by architect J.G. Link of Billings, Montana, who was charged with creating" a store that was spacious, fireproof, and dust proof."

It has also been known as Yellowstone Furniture Factory.

See also
Glidden House, also in Bridger and listed on the National Register

References

National Register of Historic Places in Carbon County, Montana
Commercial buildings completed in 1905
1905 establishments in Montana
Commercial buildings on the National Register of Historic Places in Montana